Seven ships of the Royal Navy have borne the name HMS Hastings, after the town of Hastings. Another two were planned, but renamed before entering service: 

 was a 32-gun fifth rate launched in 1695 and wrecked in 1697.
 was a 32-gun fifth rate launched in 1698. She capsized in 1707.
 was a 44-gun fifth rate launched in 1707, hulked in 1739 and sold in 1744 to become a privateer.
 was a 44-gun fifth rate originally planned as HMS Endymion, but renamed in 1739 and launched in 1741. She was broken up in 1763.
 was a 74-gun third-rate ship of the line, previously in service as an East Indiaman. She was purchased in 1819, converted to screw propulsion in 1855, used as a coal hulk from 1870 and was sold in 1885.
 was a 32-gun fifth rate launched in 1821 and broken up in 1855.
 was a  sloop launched in 1930 and broken up in 1946.
She was transferred to the Royal New Zealand Navy in 1957 and renamed , being launched in 1958.
HMS Hastings was to have been a  Batch 2TA frigate. She was renamed  before her launch in 1961, and then transferred to New Zealand and renamed .

Royal Navy ship names